Antonín Bennewitz (also Anton Bennewitz; 26 March 1833 – 29 May 1926) was a Bohemian violinist, conductor and teacher. He was in a line of violinists that extended back to Giovanni Battista Viotti, and forward to Jan Kubelík and Wolfgang Schneiderhan.

He was born in Přívrat, Bohemia as Antonín Benevic (his name is most often seen in a German rendering, Bennewitz) to a German father and a Czech mother. He studied under Moritz Mildner (Мильднер, Мориц) (Mořic Mildner: 1812-1865) at the Prague Conservatory from 1846-52. He then worked in Prague (where he was engaged as first violinist of the Estates Theatre (1852-1861)), Salzburg and Stuttgart.

In 1859 he performed in Paris and Brussels. It was during this period that on 3 December 1855 he participated in the first performance of Bedřich Smetana’s Piano Trio in G minor, Op. 15, in the Prague Konvict Hall, with Smetana himself as pianist and Julius Goltermann as cellist.

In 1866, he became Professor of Violin in Prague.  In 1876 he succeeded Mildner as leader of Friedrich Pixis (Bedřich Vilém Pixis)’s quartet, which became known as the Bennewitz Quartet.  He became the Prague Conservatory's Director in 1882, serving until 1901, when he was succeeded by Antonín Dvořák. He was among the founders of the Kammermusikverein, whose nationalist ideals stimulated Smetana to write his String Quartet in E minor From My Life.

Bennewitz's pupils included František Ondříček (who premiered the Dvořák concerto), Karel Halíř (who premiered the revised version of the Sibelius concerto), Otakar Ševčík, Franz Lehár, and three members of the Bohemian Quartet (later known as the Czech Quartet) - Karel Hoffmann and Josef Suk (violinists), and Oskar Nedbal (violist). 

On 25 February 1895, he conducted to great acclaim the first complete performance of Josef Suk's Serenade for Strings in E flat, Op. 6, with the Prague Conservatory Orchestra (two movements had been heard 14 months earlier, conducted by Suk himself).

On 3 June 1896, at the Prague Conservatory, Bennewitz conducted the first (semi-public) performances of Dvořák’s symphonic poems The Noon Witch, The Water Goblin and The Golden Spinning Wheel.

In 1998 a new Bennewitz Quartet, named in honour of Antonín Bennewitz, was founded in Prague.

References

Sources
 Grove’s Dictionary of Music and Musicians, 5th ed.

1833 births
1926 deaths
Czech classical musicians
Czech classical violinists
Male classical violinists
Czech conductors (music)
Male conductors (music)
Czech music educators
People from Ústí nad Orlicí District
Violin pedagogues